Anne-Kathrin Dern (born July 30, 1987) is a German composer and CEO of e-Quality Music Productions LLC, residing in Los Angeles, California. She is mostly known for her scores to "Fearless" (Netflix, 2020), "The Claus Family" trilogy (Netflix, 2020-2022), "" (2018), "Four Enchanted Sisters" (Buena Vista International, 2020), her works for Hallmark Media, as well as her collaborations with Klaus Badelt, most notably on "Leap!" (2016).

Early life and education 
Anne-Kathrin Dern was born in Eutin (Eastern Holstein), Germany. She later grew up in Hildesheim (Lower Saxony), Oebisfelde (Saxony-Anhalt), and Peine (Lower Saxony). After graduating from the Ratsgymnasium Peine in 2007, she went on to study at the musicube academy. Once she had obtained her Basic Film Music Composer certification, she moved to the Netherlands to further her studies with the film scoring program at the ArtEZ Conservatory. After receiving her Bachelor's degree in 2012, Dern moved to Los Angeles to attend the UCLA Film Scoring program where she concluded her studies.

Sample library development 
In early 2013, Dern was hired by sample developer Cinesamples. As part of their in-house team she helped develop new virtual instruments as well as updates to existing libraries. Products Dern worked on include the following:
 CinePerc Core / Pro / Epic / Aux v1.1
 CineWinds Core / Pro v1.1
 CineBells v1.1
 CineSymphony Lite
 World Series: Dulcimer & Zither
 CineStrings Core v1.0
 CineStrings Runs v1.0
 Artist Series: Tina Guo
 Deep Percussion Beds 2
 Tina Guo Acoustic Legato
After resigning from her full-time position at Cinesamples in late 2014, Dern continued to sporadically work for other sample developers, including SonicSmiths (The Foundry) and VIR2 / Big Fish Audio (Aeris Hybrid Choir Designer, Apollo Cinematic Guitars, Mojo Horns Vol. 2). She also programmed a private percussion library for the music production and publishing company Ninja Tracks

Film composition 
Cinesamples' sister company Hollywood Scoring hired Dern in 2014 as a mockup artist and staff composer. As part of the team she worked on productions like Riot Games' League of Legends, Microsoft's HALO V: Guardians, Disney's The Pirate Fairy, Fox's Gracepoint, and many more. A mockup she created for Alan Menken ultimately led to her being brought onto Christopher Lennertz' Galavant composing team, working on both seasons of ABC's medieval comedy musical. At the same time she also worked as an orchestrator and technical assistant at William Ross' studio Momentum.

Throughout most of 2015, Dern worked with Pinar Toprak on the Warner Bros. / Skydance production Geostorm. She also collaborated with composer Ryan Shore on his animated series Penn Zero: Part-time Hero and his Universal movie Monsterville: Cabinet of Souls. Later in 2015, Dern also worked as a temporary assistant at Steve Jablonsky's studio Arata Music, lending a hand on The Last Witch Hunter.

In early 2016, Dern accepted an internship position at Hans Zimmer's Remote Control Productions. Shortly after the internship, composer Klaus Badelt took notice of her and invited her onto his writing team for the animated movie Ballerina. Aside from her involvement in the score, Dern also wrote orchestral arrangements to some of the movie's songs by Sia and Chris Braide. It was later released in U.S. territories under the title Leap!. While working on several theme park rides with Badelt, Dern was also selected as one of the 12 composers for the annual ASCAP Film Scoring Workshop by Richard Bellis.

In early 2017, Dern collaborated with composer Emir Isilay on the Pakistani drama Saawan which won several score awards and was selected as Pakistan's official entry for the Academy Awards. This production was quickly followed by the Chinese-American drama The Jade Pendant based on the novel by L.P. Leung, and the German fantasy movie Lilly's Bewitched Christmas (aka Hexe Lilli rettet Weihnachten) based on the popular children's books by Knister. Both scores led to several positive nods by critics and most notably garnered her a coveted IFMCA nomination for Breakthrough Film Composer Of The Year. Several other feature film productions followed, including the indie drama Captain Black by Jeffrey Johnson, a German kid's comedy called Help I Shrunk My Parents (aka Hilfe, ich hab meine Eltern geschrumpft), and - resuming her work with Klaus Badelt - the Chinese drama Legend Of The Demon Cat by Chen Kaige. Dern also collaborated with British composer Daniel James on a Mongolian play and worked on iGot Games' Lords Mobile, once again with Badelt.

In 2018, Dern continued to collaborate with Klaus Badelt on productions such as Wish (Prana Studios), Ocean's 8 (Warner Bros.), and iGotGames' mobile games Castle Clash and Galaxy Mobile. She also wrote an orchestral song arrangement for the song Back To Earth by Chris Braide for Netflix' animated movie Trouble. Dern went on to collaborate with Enrico Natale (More Productions) and Elease Patrick for the award-winning short film Broken and later signed on to write the score for the award-winning Pakistani feature drama Allahu Akbar (2019).

In 2019, Dern once again teamed up with blue eyes Fiction to write the score for Four Enchanted Sisters, which was released by Disney in January 2020. Dern also scored the animated Netflix Original Fearless (2020 film) (2020) and went on to write additional music for the feature documentary Angle (2020).

In 2020, she wrote the score for blue eyes Fiction's sequel Help I Shrunk My Friends (2021) and the Netflix Christmas movie The Claus Family (2020). She also produced a song arrangement for Netflix' Academy Award winning animated short If Anything Happens I Love You (2020).

In 2021, Dern scored several Hallmark Media titles (Her Pen Pal, One Summer) and dove into the horror thriller genre with The Devil Conspiracy by Nathan Frankowski. She also returned for Netflix' The Claus Family 2 and scored Cristina Zenato's underwater short Where My World Begins.

Dern started 2022 with 3 more Hallmark Media productions (Presence of Love, Love Classified, Ghosts of Christmas Always) and an art horror film called Have.Hold.Take by DC Hamilton. She is set to return for The Claus Family 3 (Netflix) and has signed on to work on Julien Kerknawi's war drama "The Last Front", starring Iain Glen and Sasha Luss.

Dern's piece "He Is Not Coming Back" was performed by the Orchestra Moderne under the direction of Amy Andersson at Lincoln Center, NY, as part of the concert "Women Warriors: Voices of Change". The program was later recorded as an album and went on to win a Grammy Award in 2022. As part of her initiative to promote the visibility of ethnic and gender minorities in film scoring, Dern was an elected board member of the AWFC from 2019-2021. Additionally, with over 27,000 subscribers, she is the first female composer to establish a successful educational YouTube channel, in an effort to provide visibility and free knowledge to the aspiring composer community. Dern is a member of the performing rights organizations ASCAP and GEMA. She is represented by Michal Marks from A-Muse Management.

Reviews 
Dern has received very favorable reviews of her works, most notably Lilly's Bewitched Christmas and The Jade Pendant. Jonathan Broxton, president of the IFMCA, particularly points out the very traditional melodic writing in his review for The Jade Pendant: "The score is built around a stunning – and I do mean stunning – main theme. Rich, classical, lush, emotional, written for the full orchestra, with the main melody carried by different instruments depending on the situation, it’s one of the best new main themes of the year. Think of all the great Chinese-style themes played by a western orchestra: John Williams’s Memoirs of a Geisha, Rachel Portman’s Joy Luck Club, Conrad Pope’s Pavilion of Women, Klaus Badelt’s The Promise [...]. This is up there with them." About Lilly's Bewitched Christmas he says "...it shows her to have a fluid orchestral style filled with easy thematic ideas, lovely harmonies, and – on this score, specifically, a wonderful whimsical way of conveying the magic of Christmas. [...] The score has quite a bit in common with other seasonal efforts like John Williams’s Home Alone, Danny Elfman’s Edward Scissorhands, John Debney’s Elf, Bruce Broughton’s Miracle on 34th Street, Alan Silvestri’s The Polar Express, and others of that type, in the way it blends a full and lush orchestra with seasonal orchestrations – chimes, sleigh bells, glockenspiels, and even an occasional choir. [...] There’s also more than a hint of Williams’s music for the first two Harry Potter scores in the way it conveys the mood of magic and witchcraft – the string phrasing, the woodwind counterpoint, the frisky and mischievous tempos, the frequent use of a celesta." He further describes Anne-Kathrin Dern as "a serious talent to watch".

Filmography

Soundtrack Releases

Awards and nominations

References

External links 
 
 
 YouTube

1987 births
Living people
People from Eutin
German film score composers
University of California, Los Angeles alumni